Nukulei is an island in Lulunga district, in the Ha'apai islands of Tonga. Nukulei has a length of 0.73 kilometres.

References

Islands of Tonga
Haʻapai